Behzad Rafigh Doust (born 3 February 1983, in Sanandaj), is an Iranian Muay Thai kickboxer based in Thailand. He is former 3-times W.P.M.F welterweight world champion and the best coach of World Lethwei Championship in 2019.

Background 
Rafigh Doust was born on 3 February 1983 in Kurdistan. He started sport at the age of 16 in Sanandaj. His early motivations came from martial arts movies, especially Bruce Lee. After years of training and going through more than 300 amateur fights, he finally decided to immigrate to Thailand. Rafigh Doust immediately began his professional fights in Thailand. In 2014, he founded the Behzad Warrior Academy in central Bangkok.

Muay Thai career

World Professional Muaythai Federaton (WPMF) 
In 2009, Rafigh Doust fought Javier from Spain for the WPMF welterweight world title. He knocked out in the fourth round with a right hook.

That same year, he rematched Javier to defend his title and was able to win a five-round decision.

On 4 December 2010, he defended his title at Rajadamnern Boxing Stadium against Alex from Switzerland and was knocked out in the second round with a left cross.

On 5 December 2011, Rafigh Doust won the WPMF welterweight international title by defeating Jos Mendonca by decision.

WMA (World Muay Thai Alliance Association) 
On 22 May 2010, in the 8-mans WMA tournament, Rafigh Doust defeated Adyl Khodja and Esteban Ramirez by the decision of the referees, and in the final, he lost to Youssef Boughanem by decision.

Thai Fight 
On 9 August 2010, he faced Liam Harrison as part of the first-ever Thai Fight tournament. He was knocked out by low kicks and punches in the second round.

On 23 February 2013, Rafigh Doust faced Iquezang Kor.Rungthanakeat at THAI FIGHT Extreme 2013: Muay Thai Day. He lost the fight after 3 rounds by referees decision.

Prince Thailand Birthday 
In 2011, Rafigh Doust also fought against Muay Thai star Superbon Banchamek in the Prince Thailand Birthday event.

K-1 
On February 2, 2013, Rafigh Doust faced Wong Yong Choi in the K-1 Korea MAX 2013, which he lost by decision after 3 rounds.

Kunlun Fight 
On 25 January 2014, Rafigh Doust fought with Yan Xibo in the Sanda division of Kunlun Fight and was knocked out in the first round.

Coaching
After stepping down from competition, Behzad Rafigh Doust turned to coaching. He eventually established the Behzad Warrior Academy in Bangkok.

World Lethwei Championship (WLC) 
In 2019, his students Sasha Moisa and Antonio Faria became WLC champions, with Moisa becoming WLC Light Middleweight Champion and Faria becoming WLC Light Welterweight Champion. Rafigh Doust was named the World Lethwei Championship's best coach that year.

Championships and accomplishments
World Professional Muaythai Federation 
2011 WPMF International Welterweight Championship  
2009 WPMF World Welterweight Champion
Lethwei World
2019 Lethwei World Coach of the Year

Muay Thai record 

|-
|-  style="background:#FFBBBB;"
| 2014-04-14 || Loss ||align=left| Qiu Jianliang ||  Combat Banchamek || Surin, Thailand || Decision || 3 || 3:00 
|-
|-  style="background:#FFBBBB;"
| 2014-01-03 || Loss ||align=left| Iwmiset Pornarai ||  Muay Thai Combat Mania || Pattaya, Thailand || Decision || 3 || 3:00 
|-
|-  style="background:#cfc;"
| 2013-09-12 || Win ||align=left| Orono Por Muang Ubon ||  Siam Sport TV (13 Coins Stadium ) || Bangkok, Thailand || Decision || 5 || 3:00 
|-
|-  style="background:#FFBBBB;"
| 2013-04-19 || Loss ||align=left| Payakdam Mor.Phuvana || THAI FIGHT Extreme 2013: Pattaya || Pattaya, Thailand || KO || 1 || 
|-
|-  style="background:#FFBBBB;"
| 2013-03-20 || Loss ||align=left| Ruslan Kushnirenko ||  WMF Championship || Bangkok, Thailand || Decision || 3 || 3:00 
|-
|-  style="background:#FFBBBB;"
| 2013-02-23 || Loss ||align=left| Iquezang Kor.Rungthanakeat ||  THAI FIGHT Extreme 2013: Muay Thai Day || Ayutthaya, Thailand || Decision || 3 || 3:00 
|-
|-  style="background:#FFBBBB;"
| 2013-02-02 || Loss ||align=left| Wong Yong Choi || K-1 Korea MAX 2013 (Quarter-Final) || Seoul, South Korea || Decision || 3 || 3:00
|-  style="background:#cfc;"
| 2013 || Win ||align=left| Alexy ||  World boxing Stadium  || Pattaya, Thailand || KO (Knee) || 2 || 3:00 
|-
|-  style="background:#c5d2ea;"
| 2012 || Draw ||align=left| Lakha || Muay boran || Kanchanaburi, Thailand || Decision || 5 || 3:00 
|-
|-  style="background:#cfc;"
| 2011-12-05 || Win ||align=left| Jos Mendonca || WPMF (World Professional Muaythai Federation) (King's birthday)  || Bangkok, Thailand || Decision  || 5 || 3:00 
|-
! style=background:white colspan=9 |
|-  style="background:#FFBBBB;"
| 2011-04-29 || Loss ||align=left| Superbon Banchamek ||  Prince Thailand Birthday  || Ayodhya, Thailand || Decision || 3 || 3:00 
|-
|-  style="background:#cfc;"
| 2011 || Win ||align=left| Yedtajark Kaewsamrit ||International Muay Thai Charity Cups || Hong Kong || Decision || 3 || 3:00
|-
|-  style="background:#cfc;"
| 2011 || Win ||align=left| Saw Yan Naing ||  Muay boran  || Songkhla, Thailand || KO || 4 ||
|-
|-  style="background:#FFBBBB;"
| 2010-08-09 || Loss ||align=left| Liam Harrison ||  THAI FIGHT: Final 16 || Bangkok, Thailand || TKO (Low Kicks and punches) || 2 ||  
|-
|-  style="background:#FFBBBB;"
| 2010-05-22 || Loss ||align=left| Youssef Boughanem ||  WMA 8-Man tournament (Final) || Zhengzhou, China || Decision || 3 || 3:00 
|-
|-  style="background:#cfc;"
| 2010-05-22 || Win ||align=left| Adyl Khodja||  WMA 8-Man tournament (Semi-Final)|| Zhengzhou, China || Decision || 3 || 3:00 
|-
|-  style="background:#cfc;"
| 2010-05-22 || Win ||align=left| Esteban Ramirez ||  WMA 8-Man tournament (Quarter-Final) || Zhengzhou, China || Decision || 3 || 3:00 
|-
|-  style="background:#c5d2ea;"
| 2010|| Draw ||align=left| Bow Suwailek ||  Z-1  || Kuala Lumpur, Malaysia || Decision || 5 || 3:00 
|-
|-  style="background:#FFBBBB;"
| 2010-12-04 || Loss ||align=left| Alex ||  WPMF (World Professional Muaythai Federation) || Bangkok, Thailand || KO (Left cross)  || 2 || 
|-
! style=background:white colspan=9 |
|-
|-  style="background:#cfc;"
| 2009 || Win ||align=left| Wojdek Nartowicz||  WPMF (World Professional Muaythai Federation) || Kamphaeng Phet, Thailand || Decision  || 5 || 3:00 
|-
! style=background:white colspan=9 |
|-
|-  style="background:#cfc;"
| 2009 || Win ||align=left| Javier ||  WPMF (World Professional Muaythai Federation) || Bangkok, Thailand || Decision  || 5 || 3:00 
|-
! style=background:white colspan=9 |
|-
|-  style="background:#cfc;"
| 2009 || Win ||align=left| Javier ||  WPMF (World Professional Muaythai Federation) || Bangkok, Thailand || KO || 4 ||  
|-
! style=background:white colspan=9 |
|-  style="background:#cfc;"
| 2009 || Win ||align=left| Ise.I || WPMF (World Professional Muaythai Federation) || Bangkok, Thailand || KO (Elbow)  || 4 || 
|-
|-
| colspan=9 | Legend:

Mixed martial arts record 

|-
|Loss
|align=center|0–1
|Xibo Yan
|TKO (punches)
|Kunlun Fight 1
|
|align=center|1
|align=center|N/A
|Pattaya, Thailand
|
|-

See also 
	

 K-1 Korea MAX 2013
 List of WPMF male world champions
 List of male kickboxers
 2014 in Kunlun Fight
 Sasha Moisa

References

External links 
 
 

1983 births
Living people
People from Sanandaj
Iranian Muay Thai practitioners
Iranian male kickboxers
Iranian male mixed martial artists
Mixed martial artists utilizing Muay Thai
Behzad Rafigh Doust
Lightweight kickboxers
Welterweight kickboxers